Yellowfang's Secret is a children's fantasy novel written by Cherith Baldry under the pseudonym Erin Hunter. It is the fifth "Super Edition" in the Warriors novel series. Yellowfang's Secret was first released in hardcover on 9 October 2012.

Yellowfang's Secret follows Yellowfang, the ThunderClan medicine cat, during her early life in ShadowClan. Yellowfang trains as a warrior apprentice, but realizes that she is better suited as a medicine cat, and begins to train as one. The book takes place chronologically at around the same time as the other Super Editions Bluestar's Prophecy and Crookedstar's Promise.

Plot
From a young age, Yellowfang physically experiences others' pain as if it were her own. Sagewhisker, the ShadowClan medicine cat, convinces Yellowfang that this ability would make her effective as a medicine cat if she could learn to control the power. Sagewhisker thus takes Yellowfang on as an apprentice, and Yellowfang takes the medicine cats' vows, including the forsaking of taking a mate. Despite this, she has a relationship with ShadowClan warrior Raggedpelt in secret, and Yellowfang ultimately becomes pregnant with his kits. Yellowfang gives birth in secret, but only one kit, Brokenkit, survives. Yellowfang gives Brokenkit up to another she-cat in the Clan, withholding her identity as the mother. Brokenkit grows up spoiled and mistreated: his father, who is in a position of power, indulges him and refuses to punish him. His adoptive mother shuns him and his adoptive littermates bully him. As a result, he grows into a vicious cat without learning empathy or kindness. While he is growing up, Raggedpelt becomes a leader, being renamed Raggedstar. Brokentail receives his warrior name, and becomes ShadowClan's deputy (second-in-command and future leader). Brokentail trains his apprentices with extreme methods, which go unchecked as his father refuses to see the wrong in his son's actions. Brokentail eventually murders Raggedstar to gain control of the Clan, while blaming the death on neighboring WindClan.

Having taken over ShadowClan, Brokenstar institutes a vicious regime, bullying his way to eventual near-totalitarian power. Using his father's death as an excuse, he launches many attacks on WindClan, many of which Yellowfang considers unnecessary. Brokenstar, however, rejects all criticism, continuing the attacks and eventually implementing extreme tactics to sustain his war efforts: he begins training kits before they are six months old (the age laid down in the warrior code as when apprenticeship may begin), and asks the Clan's elders, who cannot contribute to the fighting forces, to leave camp in order to save resources. He additionally orders that all cats must hunt for themselves, and that battle training is to take priority. After many kits die in battle, Yellowfang finally speaks out, leading Brokenstar to falsely accuse Yellowfang of the deaths of two kits, allowing him to exile her from the Clan.

Homeless, Yellowfang enters nearby ThunderClan's territory, where she is apprehended and taken prisoner by Firepaw (a scene initially depicted in Into the Wild from Firepaw's perspective). The manga chapter at the end of the book details Yellowfang, who has become the medicine cat of ThunderClan, feeding the now blind and captive Brokentail (who has been stripped of his -star suffix due to his crimes) deathberries, and revealing that she is his mother.

Critical reception 
Barnes and Noble described the series as continuing "in high style".

Publication history 
Yellowfang's Secret was published by HarperCollins in hardcover and e-book format on 9 October 2012. The paperback edition was published on 8 April 2014. The novel has also been translated into German and Finnish. Yellowfang's Secret has also been translated into Chinese and French. The Russian translation was released in two volumes.

References

2012 American novels
2012 children's books
American fantasy novels
Warriors (novel series)
Novels about cats
HarperCollins books

ru:Пророчество Синей Звезды
zh:藍星的預言